Marinette (YTB‑791) was a United States Navy Natick-Class large district harbor tug named for Marinette, Wisconsin.

Construction

The contract for Marinette was awarded 16 June 1966. She was laid down on 8 September 1966 at Marinette, Wisconsin, by Marinette Marine and launched 10 April 1967.

Operational history
Placed in service 3 July 1967, Marinette was assigned to the 5th Naval District, headquartered at Norfolk, Virginia., until she was taken out of service in 2005.

Stricken from the Navy List 25 May 2005, Marinette was sold by Defense Reutilization and Marketing Service (DRMS) for reuse/conversion 2 August 2006.

References

External links
 

 

Natick-class large harbor tugs
Ships built by Marinette Marine
1967 ships